Faecalibacter bovis is a Gram-negative, aerobic, non-spore-forming, rod-shaped and pleomorphic bacterium from the genus of Faecalibacter which has been isolated from cow faeces.

References 

Flavobacteria
Bacteria described in 2021